The Pacific Northwest League was a professional Minor League Baseball league based in the Pacific Northwest. It was the first professional baseball league ever in the region.

History

Founding
The Pacific Northwest League was founded in 1890. In January 1890, investors met in Portland, Oregon to discuss a four-to-six team league in the Pacific Northwest. The league folded during the second half of the  season because of a nationwide economic depression known as the "Panic of 1893." During its time, the league was known for its former Major League players such as Kid Baldwin and Ollie Beard. In 1892 the league President was W. E. Rockwell and the Secretary was M. J. Roche. The 1896 version was also known as the New Pacific League. Early rules for the league included salary caps of $1,000 per month but was later raised to $1,300 per month. The league agreed to add a team from Walla Walla, Washington and either Wardner, Idaho or Wallace, Idaho in the beginning of 1892 and the league was also close to adding a team from Salem, Oregon but folded before anything was announced. The league denied Olympia, Washington a baseball team in 1892.

Second resurrection
The next season it expanded with teams in Los Angeles, California and San Francisco, California and was renamed the Pacific National League. The league competed with the California League, and eventually folded after the 1905 season. The President of the league for the two years was William Henry Lucas.

Teams

Pacific Northwest League: 1890 to 1892

Pacific Northwest League, AKA New Pacific League: 1896

Pacific Northwest League: 1898
 Portland, OR: Portland Webfoots 1898 
 Seattle, WA: Seattle Clamdiggers 1898
 Spokane, WA: Spokane Siwashes 1898 
 Tacoma, WA: Tacoma Owls 1898

Pacific Northwest League: 1901 to 1902

Pacific National League: 1903 to 1905

See also: Pacific National League

Standings and statistics

1890 to 1892

1890 Pacific Northwest League
 

1891 Pacific Northwest League
 
 

1892 Pacific Northwest League

1896, 1898
1896 Pacific Northwest League a/k/a/ New Pacific League
 The league disbanded June 15. 
 

1898 Pacific Northwest League

1901 to 1902
1901 Pacific Northwest Leagueschedule
 
 

1902 Pacific Northwest Leagueschedule

Hall of Fame alumni 
Clark Griffith, 1892 Tacoma Daisies 
Joe Tinker, 1901 Portland Webfoots

References

External links
Baseball Reference

Defunct minor baseball leagues in the United States
Baseball leagues in Oregon
Baseball leagues in Washington (state)
Baseball leagues in Montana